As-Sufūr was an Egyptian weekly avant-garde literary magazine published May 21, 1915—October 22, 1922, with few, irregular publications into 1925.

It was founded by a group of writers: Mohammed Hussein Heikal, Mustafa 'Abd ar-Raziq, and Taha Hussein. Abd al-Hamid Hamdi was the editor-in-chief.

Name 
The word sufūr ( 'unveiling') in Arabic is the opposite of hijāb ( 'veiling'). In the introductory text of the magazine's first issue, the editor Abd al-Hamid Hamdi clarified the choice of the word for the magazine's title:

History 
When the Ottoman Empire entered World War I, Britain, under British Army Officer John Maxwell, enacted legislation on November 2, 1914  that subjected the Egyptian press to censorship. This created a paucity in the Arabic press and caused many papers to cease publication. Among the periodicals affected was Ahmed Lutfi es-Sayed's newspaper Al Jarida. When the conditions drove Ahmed Lutfi es-Sayed away from the paper, some of his writers—Abd al-Hamid Hamdi, Mustafa 'Abd ar-Raziq, Mohammed Hussein Heikal, and Taha Hussein—sought to resist. They attempted to buy the rights to  magazine al-Bayan, but negotiations were unfruitful. Instead, the writers established a company and to publish as-Sufūr under Abd al-Hamid Hamdi, who assumed fiscal responsibility for the paper.

The first edition was published May 21, 1915 with eight pages. Its 307th edition was published October 22, 1922, after which it published irregularly in 1923. It was officially forced into decommission as its license was revoked for about a year and a half after publishing content deemed to have transgressed its social-literary bounds into something political. It published a few editions in 1925 before disappearing for good.

 published short stories in as-Sufūr from 1917. It was later acquired by members of al-Madrasa al-Haditha for 50 Egyptian pounds and edited by Ahmed Khairi Sa'id, serving as a precursor to the movement's magazine Al-Fajr (1925-1927).

Sections 
Editions of as-Sufur were typically organized into the following sections:

  Introduction

  Society

  Critique

  Literature

  Comedy

  Stories

References 

1915 establishments in Egypt
Literary magazines published in Egypt
Arabic-language magazines
Women's rights in Egypt